Orada Chugli is a rural locality (a selo) in Levashinsky District, Republic of Dagestan, Russia. The population was 981 as of 2010. There are 7 streets.

Geography 
Orada Chugli is located 13 km northwest of Levashi (the district's administrative centre) by road. Khakhita and Urma are the nearest rural localities.

Nationalities 
Avars live there.

Famous residents 
 Magomed Nurutdinov (European boxing champion)

References 

Rural localities in Levashinsky District